Livequake is the first live album of the progressive Italian band Eldritch, recorded at Music Street Club in Pisa.

Track listing

CD1 - Blackened Alive 
"In The House - In a Heartbeat (Intro)"
"Why"
"The Deep Sleep"
"Save Me"
'The Blackened Day"
"The World Apart"
"Reverse"
"Standing Still"
"Bless Me Now"
"The Child That Never Smiles"
"More Than Marylin"
"This Everlasting Mind Disease"
"Silent Flame"
"Toil of Mine"

CD2 - Incurably Live 
"Fall From Grace (Intro)"
"No Direction Home"
"Heretic Beholder"
"Scar"
"Bleed Mask Bleed"
"From Dusk Till Dawn"
"Nebula Surface"
"Ghoulish Gift"
"Lord of an Empty Place"
"Incurably iII"

DVD (Limited Edition)
Livequake Concert (complete CD1 + CD 2)

Extras 
 Live in Chicago 2006 (Documentary)
 Interview with Adriano Dal Canto
 Interview with the Band at Terence's House
 Videoclip: "Lonesome Existence"
 Videoclip: "Save Me"
 Videoclip: "The Blackened Day"

Livequake line-up 
Terence Holler — Vocals
Eugene Simone — lead & rhythm guitars
Rob "PEK" Proietti — rhythm guitars and backing vocals
John Crystal — bass
Raffahell Dridge — drums

Guest musicians
 Oleg Smirnoff — keyboards on the second part of the show (CD 2)

2008 albums
Eldritch (band) live albums
Limb Music albums